My Delicious Poisons is the fourth studio album by French-Belgian singer Viktor Lazlo. A French version of the album was recorded and released in France, entitled Mes Poisons Délicieux. The album was not as successful as its predecessors as it only entered the Dutch album charts, peaking at No. 71.

The first single off the album, Teach Me To Dance was co-written by Lazlo herself with Chris Rea. The album also contains a cover version of the Elkie Brooks song Pearl's a Singer.

Singles off the album were Teach Me To Dance, Love Insane and Ballad For Lisa.

Track listing

Charts

References

1991 albums
Viktor Lazlo albums
Polydor Records albums